Apostolepis goiasensis, Prado’s blackhead or Goias burrowing snake, is a species of snake in the family Colubridae. It is endemic to Brazil.

References 

goiasensis
Reptiles described in 1942
Reptiles of Brazil